Italy competed at the 1979 Mediterranean Games in Split, Croatia, Yugoslavia.

Medals

Athletics

Men

Women

See also
 Boxing at the 1979 Mediterranean Games
 Football at the 1979 Mediterranean Games
 Volleyball at the 1979 Mediterranean Games
 Water polo at the 1979 Mediterranean Games

References

External links
 Mediterranean Games Athletic results at Gbrathletics.com
 1979 - SPLIT (YUG) at CIJM web site

Nations at the 1979 Mediterranean Games
1979
Mediterranean Games